The Solar System's eight planets, and its nine most likely dwarf planets, are known to be orbited by at least 231 natural satellites, or moons. At least 20 of them are large enough to be gravitationally rounded; of these, all are covered by a crust of ice except for Earth's Moon and Jupiter's Io. Several of the largest ones are in hydrostatic equilibrium and would therefore be considered dwarf planets or planets if they were in direct orbit around the Sun and not in their current states (orbiting planets or dwarf planets).

Moons are classed in two separate categories according to their orbits: regular moons, which have prograde orbits (they orbit in the direction of their planets' rotation) and lie close to the plane of their equators, and irregular moons, whose orbits can be pro- or retrograde (against the direction of their planets' rotation) and often lie at extreme angles to their planets' equators. Irregular moons are probably minor planets that have been captured from surrounding space.

The earliest published discovery of a moon other than the Earth's was by Galileo Galilei, who discovered the four Galilean moons orbiting Jupiter in 1610. Over the following three centuries only a few more moons were discovered. Missions to other planets in the 1970s, most notably the Voyager 1 and 2 missions, saw a surge in the number of moons detected, and observations since the year 2000, using mostly large, ground-based optical telescopes, have discovered many more, all of which are irregular. 


Moons by primary 

For a very short time in 1974, Mercury was thought to have a moon.

Venus also has no moons, though reports of a moon around Venus have circulated since the 17th century.

Earth has one Moon, the largest moon of any rocky planet in the Solar System. Earth also has more than 20 known co-orbitals, including the asteroids 3753 Cruithne and 469219 Kamoʻoalewa, and the occasional temporary satellite, like 2020 CD3; however, since they do not permanently orbit Earth, they are not considered moons. (See Other moons of Earth and Quasi-satellite.)

Mars has two known moons, Phobos and Deimos ("fear" and "dread", after attendants of Ares, the Greek god of war, equivalent to the Roman Mars).

Jupiter has 95 moons with known orbits; 72 of them have received permanent designations, and 57 have been named. Its eight regular moons are grouped into the planet-sized Galilean moons and the far smaller Amalthea group. They are named after lovers of Zeus, the Greek equivalent of Jupiter. Among them is Ganymede, the largest and most massive moon in the Solar System. Its 84 known irregular moons are organized into two categories: prograde and retrograde. The prograde satellites consist of the Himalia group and three others in groups of one. The retrograde moons are grouped into the Carme, Ananke and Pasiphae groups.

Saturn has 83 moons with known orbits; 66 of them have received permanent designations, and 63 have been named. Most of them are quite small. Seven moons are large enough to be in hydrostatic equilibrium, including Titan, the second largest moon in the Solar System. Including these large moons, 24 of Saturn's moons are regular, and traditionally named after Titans or other figures associated with the mythological Saturn. The remaining 59, all small, are irregular, and classified by their orbital characteristics into Inuit, Norse, and Gallic groups, and their names are chosen from the corresponding mythologies the groups are named after. The rings of Saturn are made up of icy objects ranging in size from one centimetre to hundreds of metres, each of which is on its own orbit about the planet. Thus a precise number of Saturnian moons cannot be given, as there is no objective boundary between the countless small anonymous objects that form Saturn's ring system and the larger objects that have been named as moons. At least 150 "moonlets" embedded in the rings have been detected by the disturbance they create in the surrounding ring material, though this is thought to be only a small sample of the total population of such objects.

Uranus has 27 known moons, five of which are massive enough to have achieved hydrostatic equilibrium. There are 13 moons that orbit within Uranus's ring system, and another nine outer irregular moons. Unlike most planetary moons, which are named from antiquity, all the moons of Uranus are named after characters from the works of Shakespeare and Alexander Pope's work The Rape of the Lock.

Neptune has 14 known moons; the largest, Triton, accounts for more than 99.5 percent of all the mass orbiting the planet. Triton is large enough to have achieved hydrostatic equilibrium, but, uniquely for a large moon, has a retrograde orbit, suggesting it was a dwarf planet that was captured. Neptune also has seven known inner regular satellites, and six outer irregular satellites.

Pluto, a dwarf planet, has five moons. Its largest moon Charon, named after the ferryman who took souls across the River Styx, is more than half as large as Pluto itself, and large enough to orbit a point outside Pluto's surface. In effect, each orbits the other, forming a binary system informally referred to as a double-dwarf-planet. Pluto's four other moons, Nix, Hydra, Kerberos and Styx are far smaller and orbit the Pluto–Charon system.

Among the other dwarf planets,  has no known moons. It is 90 percent certain that Ceres has no moons larger than 1 km in size, assuming that they would have the same albedo as Ceres itself.  has one large known moon, Dysnomia.

Two objects were named as dwarf planets, under the expectation that they would prove to be so (though this remains uncertain).  has two moons, Hiʻiaka and Namaka, of radii ~195 and ~100 km, respectively.  has one moon, discovered in April 2016.

A number of other objects in the Kuiper belt and scattered disk may turn out to be dwarf planets. This list includes all objects with best estimated diameter above 700 km, including  whose satellite has not been seen since its initial discovery.

, 365 asteroid moons and 128 trans-Neptunian moons (including those of Pluto and the other dwarf planets) had been discovered.

 {| class="wikitable" style="text-align: center;"
|+Summary – number of moons
|-
! width=120 | Planet
! width=70 | Mercury
! width=70 | Venus
! width=70 | Earth
! width=70 | Mars
! width=110 | Jupiter
! width=110 | Saturn
! width=70 | Uranus
! width=110 | Neptune
|-
| Number of moons
| 0
| 0
| 1
| 2
| 95 (+45 unconfirmed)
| 83 (+83 unconfirmed)
| 27
| 14 (+1 unconfirmed)
|}

 {| class="wikitable" style="text-align: center;"
|-
! width=120 | (Possible) dwarf
! width=70 | Ceres
! width=70 | 
! width=70 | 2003 AZ84
! width=70 | Pluto
! width=70 | 
! width=70 | 
! width=70 | 2002 MS4
! width=70 | Haumea
! width=70 | 
! width=70 | Make-make
! width=70 | 
! width=70 | 2002 AW197
! width=70 | 2013 FY27
! width=70 | Gong-gong
! width=70 | Eris
! width=70 | 
|-
| 
| 0
| 1
| 1
| 5
| 0
| 1
| 0
| 2
| 1
| 1
| 1
| 0
| 1
| 1
| 1
| 0
|}

 {| class="wikitable" style="text-align: center;"
|-
! width=120 | Minor planet
|-
| See list
|}

Due to Earth's varying distance from these planets (as well as their distance to the Sun), the limits at which we are able to detect new moons is very inconsistent. As the below graph demonstrates, the absolute magnitude (total inherent brightness, abbreviated H) of moons we have detected around planets peaks at H = 17 for Jupiter, H = 16 for Saturn, H = 13 for Uranus, and H = 11 for Neptune. Smaller moons may (and most likely do) exist around each of these planets, but are currently undetectable from Earth. Although spacecraft have visited all of these planets, Earth-based telescopes continue to outperform them in moon-detection ability due to their greater availability for wide-field surveys.

List 

This is a list of the recognized moons of the planets and of the largest potential dwarf planets of the Solar System, ordered by their official Roman numeral designations. Moons that do not yet have official Roman numeral designations (because their orbits are not yet known well enough) are listed after those that do.

The 20 moons that are known to be large enough to have been rounded by their own gravity are listed in bold. The seven largest moons, which are larger than any of the known dwarf planets, are listed in bold and italic. Sidereal period differs from semi-major axis because a moon's speed depends both on the mass of its primary and its distance from it.

See also

References